Henri Marcel Hector Liebaert (29 November 1895 – 7 April 1977) was a Belgian liberal politician and minister. Liebaert was an industrialist and editor of the French-speaking Flemish daily La Flandre Libéral. He was a member of parliament (1955–1958) and senator (1958 -) and President of the Liberal Party (1953–1954). Liebaert was Minister for Economic Affairs (1946–1947) and of Finance (1949–1950 and 1954–1958).

Sources
 Presidents of the Belgian liberal party

1895 births
1977 deaths
Finance ministers of Belgium

People from Deinze